Webb Cirque is a prominent cirque at the head of the Webb Glacier in Victoria Land. The cirque is bounded by Vishniac Peak, Skew Peak and Parker Mesa, and is occupied by the névé of the Webb Glacier. Named by the Advisory Committee on Antarctic Names in 2005 in association with the Webb Glacier.

References

Landforms of Victoria Land